The Palace of Villena (Spanish: Palacio de Villena) is a palace located in Cadalso de los Vidrios, Spain.  It was built by Álvaro de Luna, Duke of Trujillo.

The building and the gardens are separately listed as Bienes de Interés Cultural (Spain's national heritage listing).
The building is listed as a monumento and has been protected since 1931, while the gardens are listed as a jardín histórico and have been protected since the 1970s.

References 

Palaces in the Community of Madrid
Gardens in Spain
Bien de Interés Cultural landmarks in the Community of Madrid